William W. Van Ness House, also known as "Talavera," is a historic home located at Claverack in Columbia County, New York.  It was built in 1818 for New York State Judge William W. Van Ness and is a Federal-style residence.  It is composed of central 2-story, two-bay main block flanked by two -story wings.  The wings are connected to the main house by single-story entrance hyphens.  The entrance features a 2-story central portico.  Also on the property are three timber-frame barns and wood-frame tool house.

It was added to the National Register of Historic Places in 1997.

References

Houses on the National Register of Historic Places in New York (state)
Federal architecture in New York (state)
Houses completed in 1818
Houses in Columbia County, New York
National Register of Historic Places in Columbia County, New York